Goran Glavčev (born June 19, 1993) is a Macedonian professional basketball Shooting guard who currently plays for Kožuv in the Macedonian First League.

External links

References

1993 births
Living people
KK Mladost Zemun players
Macedonian expatriate basketball people in Serbia
Macedonian men's basketball players
People from Gevgelija
Shooting guards